Joshua Stephen Emery (born 30 September 1990) is an English footballer who last played for  Hereford.

Career
Emery started his career as a youth player at for Cheltenham Town since the age of 13. He made his first team debut in a League One match against Southend United in the 2–0 away defeat on 2 May 2009, replacing Jake Lee as a substitute in the 55th minute.

Personal life
Emery was born in Ledbury, where he grew up. He represented Herefordshire Schools at both football and cricket.
He is the son of former Hereford United player Steve Emery.

References

External links
Josh Emery profile at ctfc.com

1990 births
Living people
People from Ledbury
Sportspeople from Herefordshire
English footballers
Association football midfielders
Cheltenham Town F.C. players
Oxford City F.C. players
Worcester City F.C. players
Cirencester Town F.C. players
Stourport Swifts F.C. players
Cinderford Town A.F.C. players
Hereford F.C. players
English Football League players